Lohardaga district is one of the twenty-four districts of the Indian state of Jharkhand. The district is named after the town of Lohardaga, the administrative headquarters of the district. The district was created from a portion of Ranchi district in 1983.

This district is surrounded by Latehar district in the north, Gumla district in south and west and Ranchi district in the east. The district is situated between 23°30' and 23°40' north latitudes and 84°40' and 84°50' east longitudes. The district covers an area of 1,502 km².

As of 2011, it is the least populous district of Jharkhand (out of 24).

It is currently a part of the Red Corridor.

Geography
District has a number of small hill blocks covered with forests. The general slope of the district is from west to east. Latehar district is situated in the north of this district, Ranchi district in the east and Gumla district in the south-west.

Lohardaga district consists of two broad physiographic divisions – the hilly tract and the plateau region. The hilly tract extends over the western and north-western parts of the district. The high hill tops of this region are known as pat. The plateau region is a part of the Gumla Plateau, which lies in the southern portion of Chota Nagpur Plateau. Lohardaga and Bhandra CD blocks are entirely in the plateau region. Other administrative areas, such as Kisko, Senha and Kuru CD blocks are partly in the plateau region and partly in the hilly tract.

The main rivers of the district are South Koel, Sankh, Nandni, Chaupat’s and Fulijhar etc. These are mainly rain fed rivers which dry up in the summer months. Some springs are also seen in the hilly tract of the district. Geologically the area in comprised with Archean Granites and Gneisses. In the uplands considerable thickness of late-rite of Pleistocene age is found in the Granite and Gneisses tracts. Alluvium of recent to sub-recent age is found in the river valleys. The major part of the district is covered with Golden Alluvium, Red and Sandy and Red and Gravelly soils. Laterite and Red and Yellow soils are also found elsewhere in the district.

The most important mineral of the district is bauxite. Other minerals which are found in the district are feldspar, fire clay and china clay and have less economic importance.

The district enjoys a healthy and pleasant climate throughout the year. The annual average temperature is 23 °C and the district receives an annual average rainfall of 1000–1200 mm.

Politics 

 |}

Economy
The net sown area is only 55% of the total area of the district. Two blocks i.e. Kisko and Senha have large area under dense forest cover. The forest cover is around 32-35% of the total area of the district. The average land holding per household is 1.65 Ha. The per capita agriculture land is around 0.28 Ha.  Net irrigated area is 13.4% of net sown area (0.8% by canals, 7% by wells, 2% by tanks & 3.6% by lift irrigation and others).

In 2006 the Indian government named Lohardaga one of the country's 250 most backward districts (out of a total of 640). It is one of the 21 districts in Jharkhand currently receiving funds from the Backward Regions Grant Fund Programme (BRGF).

Administration 
Lohardaga district consists of 7 blocks. The following are the list of the blocks in Lohardaga district:

Demographics

According to the 2011 census, Lohardaga district has a population of 461,790, roughly equal to the nation of Suriname. This gives it a ranking of 549th in India (out of a total of 640). Its population growth rate over the decade 2001-2011 was 26.67%. Lohardaga has a sex ratio of 985 females for every 1000 males, and a literacy rate of 68.29%. Schedule Castes and Scheduled Tribes make up 3.32% and 56.89% of the population respectively.

Other religions (mainly Sarna) are most practiced by 51.10% of the population. Hindus are 24.34%, Islam is 20.57% and Christianity is 3.63%.

Languages

At the time of the 2011 Census of India, 38.96% of the population in the district spoke Kurukh, 33.17% Sadri, 13.87% Urdu and 12.50% Hindi as their first language.

Other languages spoken here includes Asuri, a Munda language spoken by approximately 17,000 people.

Education and health services
There are 318 primary schools, 68 middle schools, 20 High schools, 2 higher secondary schools and two degree colleges and one degree college for girls in the district. Dr.(Mrs) Mukul Rani Singh one of the eminent educationists in Jharkhand was amongst the first few ladies to come to Lohardaga in early 1960s. She served with B.S. College as Head of Department till mid 1990s. Her stay in Lohardaga made a significant impact on the psyche of the locals and promoted girl deucation in the region. Dr. (Mrs) Mukul Rani Singh, died of cancer in the yeat 1994. In this district, there is a district hospital, one referral hospital, five primary health sub-centres, ten additional primary health centres, seventy three health sub-centres.

See also
 Bhakso Harratoli
 Lohardaga
 Latehar district
 Gumla district
 Ranchi district
 Chatra district

References

External links
Travel guide and maps of Lohardaga
Lohardaga district website
Lohardaga district

 
Districts of Jharkhand
1983 establishments in Bihar